G. mucronatus may refer to:

Gammarus mucronatus, a species of scud
Griffithides mucronatus, junior synonym of Paladin mucronatus, a species of trilobite

Taxonomy disambiguation pages